Judit Kovács (born 7 June 1969 in Debrecen, Hajdú-Bihar) is a retired female high jumper from Hungary. Her personal best jump was 1.94 metres, achieved in August 1992 in Budapest.

She finished sixth at the 1990 European Athletics Championships, eighth at the 1991 World Championships and fifth at the 1992 European Athletics Indoor Championships. She also competed at the 1992 Summer Olympics. She became Hungarian champion in 1989, 1990, 1991 and 1992.

International competitions

 Results in parenthesis (#) indicates superior height achieved in qualifying round.
 Results with a (q) indicates overall position in qualifying round.

Awards
 Hungarian athlete of the Year (1): 1991

References

External links
 
 

1969 births
Living people
Sportspeople from Debrecen
Hungarian female high jumpers
Olympic athletes of Hungary
Athletes (track and field) at the 1992 Summer Olympics
World Athletics Championships athletes for Hungary